Abandoned is a 2001 Hungarian film directed by Arpád Sopsits. It was Hungary's submission to the 74th Academy Awards for the Academy Award for Best Foreign Language Film, but was not accepted as a nominee.

Plot
Abandoned at an orphanage by his recently divorced father, Aron endures a life full of cruelty and despair, punctuated by beating from the orphanage staff and ridicule from the other boys. His only friend is his classmate Attila, who helps him discover love and gives him strength to fight back.

See also

Cinema of Hungary
List of submissions to the 74th Academy Awards for Best Foreign Language Film

References

External links
 

2001 films
2000s Hungarian-language films
2001 drama films
Hungarian drama films